Empress Cao (1016 – November 16, 1079) was a Chinese empress consort of the Song dynasty, married to Emperor Renzong of Song. She served as regent of China during the illness of Emperor Yingzong, from 1063 until 1064.

Life
Cao was born in modern Hebei Province. She was the granddaughter of Cao Bin, one of the founding generals of the Song Dynasty.

Empress
In 1033, after the death of Empress Dowager and regent Liu, Renzong, against the advice of his officials, deposed his 1st empress, the childless Empress Guo, who had been the protegee of Empress Liu. In September 1034, he made Cao his 2nd empress. She was fond of gardening, and reared silkworms. 

Empress Cao was respected by state officials, who did not oppose her to assist the emperor in governing the state during his illnesses and attended to state affairs by his side.  In 1048, an uprising of the Imperial guards took place in her personal palace against the Emperor, and Cao was credited in saving his life.  The Emperor initially blamed Cao for the uprising because it had taken place in her palace.  However, he accepted the result of the following investigation, which concluded that the rumor that Cao had been behind the uprising was slander.  

Empress Cao had no children, and in 1036, the emperor adopted his four-year-old cousin, the future Emperor Yingzong, and appointed him heir to the throne. Cao became the foster mother of the Crown Prince, and she also selected her niece, the future Empress Gao (Song dynasty), to become her daughter-in-law.

Regency
In 1063, her adoptive son, Emperor Yingzong, succeeded her spouse as Emperor. Shortly after his succession, however, he became severely ill, and the officials asked her to govern as regent during his illness. Empress Dowager Cao accepted and ruled China as regent for a little over a year. She was cautioned with the bad example of Empress Liu, who was said to have favored her relatives in politics and usurped Imperial rituals for herself, and Cao was careful not to do this during her regency. 
She gave audience to the Councillors behind a lowered screen in a smaller hall rather than in the main throne hall, and she was not given Imperial prerogatives.  When the Emperor recovered in 1064, the officials asked her to step down from regency and let him govern by himself, but she refused.  Her opponent prime minister Han Qi then removed the screen from the audience hall while the court was in session, which made it impossible for her to attend and forced her to retire as regent.

Later life
In 1067, Emperor Shenzong succeeded to the throne, and Cao was given the title Grand Empress Dowager. Shenzong was sometimes willing to listen to her advice, and she managed to have the imprisonment of the conservative poet Su Shi transformed to exile.

Notes

External links 
 http://www.guide2womenleaders.com/China_Heads.htm

1016 births
1079 deaths
Song dynasty empresses
11th-century women rulers
Song dynasty empresses dowager
Chinese grand empresses dowager
11th-century Chinese women
11th-century Chinese people